Yueliangdao is a subdistrict of Wangcheng district, Changsha, Hunan, China. It is located on the western bank of Xiang river, the subdistrict is bordered by Dazehu subdistrict to the north, Huangjinyuan to the west, Wangyue and Guanshaling subdistricts of Yuelu district to the south, Xiufeng subdistrict across the Xiang river to the east.

History
Yueliangdao was formed by the revocation of Xingcheng (and setting up three new subdistricts) in 2012. Xingcheng was formed by Dahu and Gushan in 1995. there were 22 villages and two residential communities in 1997.

In July 2012, Xingcheng was changed from a town as a subdistrict. On August 28, 2012, Xingcheng was divided into three subdistricts, they are Baishazhou, Dazehu and Yueliangdao subdistricts. 
 The Yueliangdao contains Yueliangdao residential community, Yinxing, Zhonghualing and Daigongmiao villages; 
 The Dazehu subdistrict contains Dongma residential community, Xitang, Huilong and Nantang villages;
 The Baishazhou subdistrict contains Maqiaohe, Tengfei and huangtian three villages.

References

Township-level divisions of Wangcheng
Wangcheng